Yevgeni Stepanovich Andreyev (born 11 March 1988) is a Russian former professional football player.

Club career
He made his Russian Football National League debut for FC Irtysh Omsk on 27 March 2010 in a game against FC Nizhny Novgorod.

Honours
 Russian Second Division, Zone East best midfielder: 2009.

References

External links
 

1988 births
People from Elista
Living people
Russian footballers
Russia youth international footballers
Association football midfielders
FC Torpedo Moscow players
FC Irtysh Omsk players
FC Spartak Moscow players
FC Tekstilshchik Ivanovo players
FC Novokuznetsk players
FC Nosta Novotroitsk players
Sportspeople from Kalmykia